Emergent may refer to:

 Emergent (album), a 2003 album by Gordian Knot
 Emergent (software), Neural Simulation Software
 Emergent BioSolutions, a multinational biopharmaceutical company headquartered in Gaithersburg, Maryland, USA
 Emergent properties, when simple entities interact to produce more complex ones
 Any of the group of trees growing above the canopy in a rainforest

See also
 Emergence (disambiguation)
 Emergentism